Iurus is a genus of scorpions belonging to the family Iuridae.

The species of this genus are found in Eastern Mediterranean.

Species:

Iurus dekanum 
Iurus dufoureius 
Iurus kinzelbachi

References

Scorpion genera
Scorpions of Asia
Scorpions of Europe
Taxa named by Tamerlan Thorell